"I Just Called" is a song by Swedish duo Neiked, English singer Anne-Marie, and American rapper Latto. The song was released on 27 May 2022, through Asylum and Warner. The song interpolates Stevie Wonder's 1984 song "I Just Called to Say I Love You".

Background 
In an interview with Official Charts, Neiked said that Stevie Wonder heard "I Just Called" before its release and gave the song his approval.

Charts

References 

2022 songs
2022 singles
Neiked songs
Anne-Marie (singer) songs
Latto songs
Songs written by Anne-Marie (singer)
Songs written by Stevie Wonder
Songs written by Latto
Asylum Records singles
Warner Records singles